The Marching 100 is the official name of the marching band at Florida A&M University (FAMU) in Tallahassee, Florida. Since its inception, the band has been credited for 30 innovative techniques which have become standard operating procedures for many high school and collegiate marching band programs.

History 

The first band at FAMU was organized in 1892, under P.A. Van Weller. In 1946, William P. Foster became director of bands, starting with 16 members.  Since then, the band has grown to over 440 members.   The band has performed at the Super Bowl (on several occasions), the Summer Olympics, the inaugural parades for U.S. presidents Bill Clinton and Barack Obama, and was selected to be the official United States representative to the Bicentennial Celebration of the French Revolution in Paris, France.

The band also featured as opening act for Louis Vuitton's men's fashion show in Louvre during 2022 Paris Fashion Week.

Directors, assistant directors, and staff

Directors 

P.A. Van Weller, 1892–1898
Nathaniel C. Adderly, 1910–1918
Leander A. Kirksey, 1930–1946
William P. Foster, 1946–1998
Julian E. White, 1998–2012
Sylvester Young 2013–2016
Shelby R. Chipman 2016–present

Assistant directors and staff 
Shelby R. Chipman (Fall '82) – Director of University Bands
Samuel A. Floyd, Jr. Instructor in Music and assistant director of Bands, 1962–64
Shaylor L. James (Fall '60) – Assistant Director Of Bands, Director Of Percussion
Lindsey B. Sarjeant (Fall '68) – Assistant Director Of Bands, Arranger, chair, FAMU Department of Music
Nicholas B. Thomas (Fall '96) – Assistant Director of Bands, Director of Woodwinds, Music Teacher Education Coordinator
Ralph Jean-Paul (Fall '2000) – Assistant Director of Bands, Director of Lower Brasses
Sylvester Young – (Fall '67) – Drill and Design
Robert U. Griffin – (Fall '74) – Director of Trombones
Longineau Parsons – (Fall '72) – Director of Trumpets
Zackery Chambers (Fall ‘1998) - Director of French Horns
Donald Beckwith (Fall '75) – Senior Storekeeper and Equipment Manager
Kimberly Jackson-Taylor – Department of Music Office Manager
Deirdre L. McRoy – Department of Music Compliance Officer
Joe Bullard – Announcer

Band motto 

The band motto was developed by William Patrick Foster in the beginning of his more than 50-year tenure as Director of Bands at FAMU.

Qualities to live by to guide our thoughts and to rule our actions and lives:
Highest Quality of CHARACTER
Achievement in ACADEMICS
Attainment of LEADERSHIP
Perfection in MUSICIANSHIP
Precision in MARCHING
Dedication to SERVICE

The Florida A&M University bands, a role model of excellence.

Summer Band Camp 
The Marching 100 Summer Band Camp has been in existence since 1990, when it had fewer than 100 members. The majority of those in attendance were from Burke HS (Charleston, South Carolina), and William M. Raines HS (Jacksonville, Florida). Apart from the Marching Band there are three symphonic bands (Honor, Orange, and Green), two jazz bands, a percussion ensemble, keyboard and electronic music, and an ensemble for every instrument. The camp also includes drum majors and flags. The camp students are taught by "Marching 100" members, and perform at their symphonic concert, ensemble concert, parade, and the final marching exhibition of Bragg Memorial Stadium.

Hazing 

Evidence of hazing in the band made headlines after the death of a Marching 100 drum major in 2011.  On November 19, 2011, Robert Champion, the 26-year-old drum major, was beaten to death on the bus after the annual Blue Cross Blue Shield Florida Classic between Florida A&M University and Bethune Cookman University.  Investigators found that hazing was involved in the incident. The Orange County Sheriff's Office ruled the death a homicide.  An autopsy determined that he had "badly beaten muscles."  Florida A&M canceled all of the band's remaining scheduled performances for the 2011–12 school year and launched an investigation.

In May 2012, two faculty members resigned in connection with the ensuing hazing investigation and 13 people were charged with felony or misdemeanor hazing crimes.  Later that month, FAMU president James Ammons announced that the band would not return until 2013–14 at the earliest out of respect for Champion, as well as to give school officials time for a root-and-branch restructuring of the band.  Earlier, it had been revealed that at least 101 band members were not enrolled at FAMU.  Two months later, Ammons resigned. On August 28, 2012, Dante Martin, identified as the "president" of the band bus, was accused of felony hazing in Robert Champion's death. He pleaded not guilty to a misdemeanor in connection with a separate hazing incident. After an unsuccessful mediation session between university attorneys and attorneys representing the family of Robert Champion, FAMU offered to pay $300,000 to the family during the first week of November 2012 as settlement. On March 4, 2013, prosecutors charged 12 former band members with manslaughter for the 2011 hazing death. On June 27, 2013, Florida A&M lifted the suspension of the band.  School officials instituted new academic requirements for the band, as well as a zero-tolerance policy for hazing that applies to all campus organizations. On October 31, 2014, Dante Martin was found guilty of manslaughter and three counts of hazing and on January 9, 2015, he was sentenced to six years in prison.

References

External links 
 

Florida A&M University
Musical groups from Florida
Musical groups established in 1946
Southwestern Athletic Conference marching bands
1946 establishments in Florida